Sinenhlanhla Zwane (born 22 July 2000) is a South African cricketer. He made his first-class debut for Easterns in the 2018–19 CSA 3-Day Provincial Cup on 14 March 2019. In April 2021, he was named in Easterns' squad, ahead of the 2021–22 cricket season in South Africa. He made his Twenty20 debut on 9 October 2021, for Easterns in the 2021–22 CSA Provincial T20 Knock-Out tournament. He made his List A debut on 3 April 2022, for Easterns in the 2021–22 CSA One-Day Cup.

References

External links
 

2000 births
Living people
South African cricketers
Easterns cricketers